"Just Don't Give a Fuck" (known as "Just Don't Give" in the clean version) is the debut single by American rapper Eminem. The original version appears as the only single on his only EP, the Slim Shady EP. A re-recorded version appears on his major-label debut album, The Slim Shady LP. According to the book Angry Blonde, this was Eminem's first "real" song, and was when he first came up with the "Slim Shady" theme. The song samples the song "I Don't Give a Fuck" by Tupac Shakur.

Disses
The second verse implies that Eminem is superior to several white rappers, notably Everlast, Miilkbone and Vanilla Ice, each of whom later released diss tracks against Eminem. Miilkbone released "Dear Slim" and "Presenting Miilkbone" and Vanilla Ice released "Exhale" and "Hip Hop Rules" in 2001 on his album Bi-Polar. Everlast had a long-lasting feud with Eminem. Although Eminem dissed Vanilla Ice in other tracks (such as "Marshall Mathers" and "Role Model"), he did not reply to either him or Miilkbone after their respective disses.

Critical reception
Stephen Thomas Erlewine of Allmusic marked it as a stand out on LP. RapReviews described the beat of the song as "head nodding" but he also noted that the remix is subpar: the "new one (remix) is lifeless and oddly out of place among an album full of mostly dope cuts" in comparison to the original.

Music video

The black-and-white video, interspersed with some color, is set in a trailer park in the summer. A variety of scenes, unrelated to each other, are shown, starting with a boy being stopped by a woman from taking food off a table. The boy returns as Eminem and strangles her. In one version, the video shows him beating her and throwing her on a bed. The video also includes scenes of people drinking and swimming in a pool. Additional scenes include aliens, a clown, and people eating watermelons.

The clean version of the accompanying music video for this single is known as "I Just Don't Give a".

Track listing
US 12" Vinyl Single (Slim Shady EP)

US CD Promo

US CD Single / US Cassette Single

US CD Maxi Single / US Cassette Maxi Single / US 12" Vinyl Promo

US 12" Vinyl Single

Notes
 signifies a co-producer.

Charts

Weekly charts

References

1998 debut singles
Eminem songs
Song recordings produced by Eminem
Aftermath Entertainment singles
Interscope Records singles
Hardcore hip hop songs
Horrorcore songs
Songs written by Jeff Bass
Songs written by Eminem
1997 songs
Songs about fictional male characters